The Henry Ford Health System 200 was a NASCAR Gander RV & Outdoors Truck Series race that took place at Michigan International Speedway. The event was started in 1999 and was won by Greg Biffle. In 2001 Michigan did not hold a Truck race because of date conflicts with the CART event which it had been associated. The 2004 race marked the first win for Toyota in a national NASCAR series when Travis Kvapil won for Bang! Racing. The race was removed from the 2021 schedule.

The Henry Ford Health System 200 is the same race as the 2020 Vet Tix/Camping World 200.

Past winners

2004: First NASCAR win for Toyota.
2006, 2011, 2019 and 2020: The race was extended due to a NASCAR Overtime finish.
2012: Piquet scored his first win in the Truck Series, thus becoming the first Brazilian driver to win a Truck Series event.

Multiple winners (drivers)

Multiple winners (teams)

Manufacturer wins

References

External links
 

Former NASCAR races
NASCAR Truck Series races
 
Recurring sporting events established in 1999
1999 establishments in Michigan
August sporting events
Saturday events
Recurring sporting events disestablished in 2020